The Bughea is a right tributary of the Râul Târgului in Romania. Its two source rivers (Izvorul Zănoaga and Izvorul Dragoșu) originate in the Iezer Mountains. It flows into the Râul Târgului near Mihăești.

References

Rivers of Romania
Rivers of Argeș County